Russia women's national under-18 ice hockey team represents Russia at the International Ice Hockey Federation's IIHF World Women's U18 Championships. The Russia women's national U18 team is controlled by Ice Hockey Federation of Russia. After the 2022 Russian invasion of Ukraine, the International Ice Hockey Federation suspended Russia from all levels of competition.

World Women's U18 Championship record

References

External links
 Russia Under 18's website

under
Women's national under-18 ice hockey teams